"Somewhere Under Heaven" is a song recorded by Tom Petty during the Wildflowers studio sessions in 1992. It was released in 2015 as promotion for a multi-disc Wildflowers re-release titled Wildflowers & All the Rest, which was previously shelved and then released in 2020. The song was featured in the film Entourage.

Background 
"Somewhere Under Heaven" was written by Tom Petty and guitarist Mike Campbell in 1992 during the recording of Petty's second solo album Wildflowers, however was left off the final release. It was produced by Petty and Campbell, and mixed by the Heartbreakers’ long-time collaborator, Ryan Ulyate.

Personnel 
Credits Adapted from Wildflowers & All the Rest.

Musicians

 Mike Campbell – guitars, bass guitar, organ, drums 
 Tom Petty - lead vocals 

Production

 Chris Bellman – mastering
 Mike Campbell – producer
 Tom Petty – producer
 Brian Scheuble – engineer
 Ryan Ulyate – mixer

References 

Tom Petty songs
2015 songs